Guddu Rangeela is an Indian action black comedy film, directed by Subhash Kapoor. It stars Arshad Warsi, Amit Sadh and Ronit Roy in lead roles. The film is presented by Fox Star Studios and produced by Sangeeta Ahir. Guddu Rangeela has incorporated the Manoj-Babli honour killing case in the storyline.

Plot
Based in North India, Guddu Rangeela is a story about two cousins trying to make ends meet in the crime infested surroundings. Rangeela (Arshad Warsi) and Guddu (Amit Sadh) are orchestra singers by day and informants by night, acquiring measly pay offs from the information provided to local gangsters about the richest families in town, has fetched them an easy and safe way to subsist without getting their hands dirty in the bargain. Although cousins by blood, both are very much unlike each other. The love hate rapport of the two comes to be seen through the many dangerously funny circumstances that they are met with and their impromptu methods of saving their skin each time. Having suffered a tragic past at the hands of the gang lord turned politician Billu Pahalwan (Ronit Roy); the antagonist of the tale; both are discreetly entangled in a 10-year-old legal battle against him through Gupta, an honest advocate fighting on their behalf.

While the unorthodox and impulsive Guddu aspires to grow out of their hand to mouth way of life by executing the loot themselves, the comparatively self-righteous and mature Rangeela despises the idea of getting onto the dark side of the city's law. Like money, women too are Guddu's poison, who is time and again seen flirting and effortlessly pulling off one night stands. Rangeela on the contrary hasn't moved on from the tragedy that consumed his only love Babli (Shriswara) years back. Rangeela's prime motto has always been to overthrow his nemesis Billo, thus undoing the injustice and cruelty that transpired years back. Lucky enough, one such opportunity comes knocking. They kidnap Baby (Aditi Rao Hydari) looking to make an easy 1 million money in the process. In the process finds himself confronting the vicious and tyrannical Billo. What follows is a chaotic tale of redemption and payback. An ambition, a plan, a kidnapping and a To-and-Fro tale of victory and defeat leading up to a dramatic climax.

Cast

 Arshad Warsi as Rangeela
 Amit Sadh as Guddu
 Ronit Roy as Billu Pahalwan, the main antagonist 
 Aditi Rao Hydari as Baby
 Sandeep Goyat as Chottey
 Shriswara as BabliJ
 Dibyendu Bhattacharya as Bangali
 Brijendra Kala
 Achint Kaur as CM
 Amit Sial as Police Inspector Ajay Singh
 Rajiv Gupta as Inspector Gulab Singh
 Virendra Saxena as lawyer
 Naushad Abbas as goon

Reception
The film grossed an estimated  after five days of its release and after that dropped heavily.

Soundtrack

The songs for Guddu Rangeela are composed by Amit Trivedi while lyrics are written by Irshad Kamil. The first single "Mata Ka Email" was released on 8 June 2015. The full audio album was released on 19 June 2015. Music rights for the film are acquired by Sony Music India & Zee Music Company.

References

External links 
 
 

2010s Hindi-language films
2015 films
Fox Star Studios films
Indian comedy films
Films directed by Subhash Kapoor
2015 comedy films